Kauko Kalle Mäkinen (20 July 1927 – 5 August 1968) was a Finnish ice hockey player. He competed in the men's tournament at the 1952 Winter Olympics.

References

External links

1927 births
1968 deaths
Finnish ice hockey players
Ice hockey players at the 1952 Winter Olympics
Ice hockey people from Tampere
Olympic ice hockey players of Finland